The 2001 American Memorial was a Championship Auto Racing Teams (CART) motor race held on September 15, 2001, at the EuroSpeedway Lausitz, in Klettwitz, Germany. It was the 16th round of the 2001 CART season and the first race in the series to be held in Europe. Originally known as the German 500, the race's name was changed by CART in the aftermath of the September 11 attacks. Kenny Bräck won the race for Team Rahal after starting from second position; his teammate Max Papis finished in second place, and Patrick Carpentier was third.

The season points leader entering the race, Gil de Ferran, was awarded the pole position when qualifying was cancelled after a practice session was rained out. Bräck took the lead early in the race, and built a seven-second advantage before going off course while trying to lap another car. Carpentier took his place after the lap 64 incident, and held the lead until Tony Kanaan passed him on lap 95. After passing Carpentier for second, Alex Zanardi moved ahead of Kanaan after a series of pit stops between laps 121 to 123. Zanardi held the top spot entering his final scheduled pit stop with 12 laps remaining.

Upon leaving the pit lane, Zanardi lost control of his car, which turned sideways onto the circuit. Alex Tagliani crashed into Zanardi's car, splitting the chassis into two pieces. The crash led to the amputation of both of Zanardi's legs. The rest of the race was run under a caution flag, and Bräck, who had moved into second place before Zanardi's pit stop, secured the victory. Zanardi and Tagliani were taken to a Berlin hospital; Zanardi had a fractured pelvis and a concussion in addition to his amputations, while Tagliani was not severely injured.

Report

Background
The German 500 was the first CART race ever to be held in Europe. It was the beginning of a two-week European stretch for the series; the Rockingham 500 was held at Rockingham Motor Speedway in Corby, England one week later. EuroSpeedway chairman Hans-Jörg Fischer hoped for a crowd of 70,000 at the track, which had a capacity of 90,000.

Entering the German 500, the 16th round of the 2001 CART season, Gil de Ferran held the lead in the season's points standings with 115 points. Bräck and Hélio Castroneves were joint second on 110 points, and Michael Andretti was fourth, seven points further back.

Four days before the race, the September 11 attacks took place, causing most major American sporting events scheduled on the same weekend as the German 500 to be postponed, including National Football League (NFL) and Major League Baseball (MLB) games, and a NASCAR Winston Cup Series race, the New Hampshire 300, at New Hampshire Motor Speedway. The Italian Grand Prix, a Formula One race, was held that weekend. According to Ronald Richards, the vice president of CART, the series decided to continue with the race prior to the cancellation of that week's NFL games, a decision followed by other American leagues. Richards acknowledged that "We wish we would have had the input regarding the NFL's decision prior to making our decision."

In remembrance of the September 11 attacks' victims, and in a desire to avoid criticism for holding the German 500 so soon afterward, CART changed the race's name to the American Memorial. The series also held tributes on the day of the race, and made a $500,000 donation to the World Trade Center Relief Fund, matching the event's prize fund.

Practice and qualifying

The first day of practice for the American Memorial was scheduled on September 13, but was cancelled because of rain. Practice was held the following day, and Tony Kanaan of Mo Nunn Racing recorded the fastest lap of 34.624 seconds. Teammate Zanardi had a lap of 34.991 seconds for the second-fastest time; he was followed by Carpentier, Bräck, and Bruno Junqueira.

As of September 13, Andretti was unable to travel to Germany from his Nazareth, Pennsylvania residence, since his planned September 11 flight had been grounded. Andretti was able to arrange a charter flight to Germany and landed in Dresden the next day.

Due to the rainout and the racers' lack of familiarity with the EuroSpeedway, CART cancelled qualifying for the American Memorial. The starting grid was determined by drivers' order in the season points standings. The pole position went to de Ferran, though due to the lack of qualifying, he was not awarded a point in the standings as was customary for pole winners. Bräck earned second position since he held a tie-breaker over Castroneves, who started third, and Andretti began the race in fourth.

Race

On race day, a 30-minute warm-up session was held before the event began; Kanaan again posted the fastest time (35.288 seconds), followed by Zanardi and Paul Tracy. The 154-lap race began at 1:56 p.m. local time; Bräck immediately took the lead, and Andretti went into second coming out of the first turn. They remained the top two in lap 20, with Dario Franchitti in third. Six laps later, Andretti passed Franchitti to reclaim second when the latter was unable to pass a slower car. Drivers near the lead begin making their first round of pit stops on lap 35, and continued doing so through lap 40. Around that time, Bryan Herta and Cristiano da Matta experienced problems with their cars and became the first two drivers to retire from the race. By lap 60, Bräck had built a lead of more than seven seconds. Carpentier had moved into second place, and Andretti, Tagliani, and Franchitti rounded out the top five. Bräck relinquished his lead on lap 64, when he went off course while attempting to lap Junqueira. The first caution flag of the day came out, but not before Carpentier took the lead as Bräck regained control of his car and re-entered the track in second place. Pit stops took place during the caution, with Carpentier, Bräck, and Andretti still in the top three positions.

Green flag racing resumed on lap 70, and Kanaan began moving toward the front of the field; he passed Andretti for third place on lap 73, and took second from Bräck four laps later. The second caution of the race occurred on lap 80, when Junqueira and Toranosuke Takagi collided; Takagi spun off the track, but was able to continue. Andretti and Franchitti made pit stops during the caution, and the green flag came out on lap 85. Kanaan passed Carpentier on lap 95, and Zanardi went into second shortly afterward, as Carpentier tried conserving fuel to complete the race with one fewer pit stop than the other contenders. Kanaan, Zanardi, and Bräck made pit stops from laps 105 to 113, and Andretti inherited the lead. Franchitti suffered a "mechanical problem" on lap 116 and had to retire from the race. More pit stops occurred from laps 121 to 123, and Zanardi claimed the lead over Kanaan. The two contested the lead, and Kanaan was two-tenths of a second behind Zanardi when he made a pit stop for the final time on lap 141. Bräck moved up to second, and was followed by Carpentier and Tagliani.

Zanardi accident and finish
Zanardi went onto pit road for his last stop on lap 142. When attempting to re-enter the track, "he seemed to accelerate too early", according to the Associated Press' recap. Zanardi could not control his vehicle's rear end, and the car slid sideways onto the track, after having gone through grass. The impact split Zanardi's chassis into two pieces and littered the circuit with debris. The drivers were taken by airlift to the Klinikum Berlin-Marzahn hospital. Following the accident, the last 12 laps were run under a caution flag. There was one further retirement, on lap 153; Christian Fittipaldi made a pit stop due to a fire in the back of his car and dropped out. Bräck won the race, finishing ahead of Papis and Carpentier, who were second and third respectively. Andretti took fourth place, followed by Oriol Servia in fifth, Takagi in sixth, and Kanaan in seventh. De Ferran, Scott Dixon, and Tracy rounded out the top ten.

Post-race

According to CART physician Dr. Steve Olvey, Zanardi's diagnosis when he left the track was "extremely critical". His life had been endangered by the crash when the collision caused a traumatic amputation of both of his legs: the entire left leg from the thigh down and the right leg from the knee down. This resulted in the loss of 75% of his blood volume; last rites were given to him afterward. Upon arriving at Klinikum Berlin-Marzahn, Zanardi underwent a three-hour operation to clean and close the wounds. He also fractured his pelvis and suffered a concussion. Tagliani had a sore back as a result of the accident, and was released from the hospital after one day. On September 17, one of Zanardi's doctors said that his life was not in danger, although he had been placed under an induced coma in an attempt to prevent trauma shock. Doctors took Zanardi off the coma three days later, and he left Klinikum Berlin-Marzahn on October 30.

Johnny Herbert, who had previously been Zanardi's teammate in Formula One, said of the incident, "It's a big shock to everybody. You have accidents, yes, but you don't expect something this gruesome." Laz Denes, a spokesman for Zanardi's Mo Nunn Racing team, said the impact was "immense, almost harder than anything I've ever seen." According to Denes, the point of contact "was about 12 inches past the cockpit," and he called Zanardi's survival a "miracle". Tagliani commented several days after the crash that Zanardi was constantly in his thoughts. During his hospital stay, Zanardi contacted Tagliani and told him that he was not at fault.

With his victory, Bräck claimed the lead in the points competition; with five races left in the season, he had 131 points. De Ferran was in second, 11 points behind Bräck, and Andretti was five points further back. Castroneves was 20 points out of the lead, in fourth place. Dixon trailed Bräck by 45 points, and was in front of Franchitti by one point. Carpentier's top-three finish left him in seventh, with 83 points, while Cristiano da Matta was five points behind him.

In 2002, the German 500 was not held after the EuroSpeedway filed for insolvency. The race returned to EuroSpeedway the following year, as did Zanardi, who ran 13 laps to represent those that he never completed in 2001.

Classification

Race

Standings after the race

Note: Only the top five positions are included for the drivers' standings.

References

External links
Results from Champ Car website (through Internet Archive)

American Memorial, 2001
American Memorial
American Memorial